The Fifth of July is a historic celebration of an Emancipation Day in New York, marking the state's culminating 1827 abolition of slavery after a gradual legislative process. State law passed under Governor Daniel D. Tompkins a decade earlier had designated Independence Day, the Fourth of July as when abolition would take effect, but to differentiate from Fourth of July celebrations, African Americans instead celebrated on the following day.  These celebrations continued on July 5 for many years in New York.

History
African Americans in New York had made preparations from at least March 1827, reported in the newly established Freedom's Journal. Nathaniel Paul at Albany led a meeting that "Resolved, That whereas the 4th day of July is the day that the National Independence of this country is recognized by white citizens, we deem it proper to celebrate the 5th".

On July 4, 1827, New York's black churches held services of prayer and thanksgiving.  William Hamilton gave a speech at the Mother AME Zion Church (then in its original home of Church and Leonard Street), the site of the largest celebration.  He discussed the historic context of the event and the 1741 incident as examples of the troubled past, celebrated the emancipation law as a redemption, and proclaimed that "no more shall negro and slave be synonymous."  Attendees at the events dispersed quietly, fearful that whites in their own Independence Day revels would pick fights.

The largest celebration in New York City on July 5, 1827 saw 2,000–4,000 celebrants gather at St. John's Park, led by marshal Samuel Hardenburgh.  Numerous groups participated; the first in the parade line was the New York African Society for Mutual Relief.  From the park, they paraded to Zion Church, and then to City Hall on Broadway where they met Mayor William Paulding Jr.  Nathaniel Paul spoke at Albany on the same day in 1827. There was internal community debate about how visible public celebrations should be. Henry Highland Garnet and James McCune Smith recollected participating in the first celebration in New York City in their youths, the latter recalling diverse African diaspora celebrants, including from the Caribbean and Africa. The observance in its early years was documented in an 1833 anonymous travelogue by an Englishman, believed to be the Liverpool merchant James Boardman.

The New York black community continued to reserve the Fourth of July for a bitter reflection on the gap between America's promise and its reality, and the Fifth of July for their own personal celebration.  Frederick Douglass's 1852 oration in Rochester on "What to the Slave Is the Fourth of July?" is the most noted text from this tradition, and has been seen by historians as embodying a different conception of patriotism.

The New York branches of the Association for the Study of African American Life and History supported "Abolition Commemoration Day" as a state holiday on the second Monday in July, and it was recognized by the state legislature along with Juneteenth in 2020.

References

1827 establishments in New York (state)
Abolitionism in the United States
African-American events
African-American history of New York (state)
Emancipation day
Frederick Douglass
July observances
Independence Day (United States) festivals
Observances in New York City